Ballads and Blues is a compilation album by the American jazz musician Miles Davis. It was released on March 19, 1996, by Columbia Records and recorded from March 9, 1950, to March 9, 1958.

Track listing 
"I Waited for You" (Fuller, Gillespie) – 3:30
"Yesterdays" (Arkeen, Harbach, James, Johnson, Kern, Rose) – 3:44
"One for Daddy-O" (Adderley, Adderley) – 8:25
"Moon Dreams" (MacGregor, Mercer) – 3:18
"How Deep Is the Ocean?" (Berlin) – 4:38
"Weirdo" (Davis) – 4:43
"Enigma" (Johnson) – 3:22
"It Never Entered My Mind" (Hart, Rodgers) – 4:01
"Autumn Leaves" (Kosma, Mercer, Prevert) – 10:58

Personnel

Cannonball Adderley – alto saxophone
Nat Adderley, Jr. – composing
West Arkeen – composing
John Barber – tuba
Art Blakey – drums
Kenny Clarke – drums
Gil Coggins – piano
Miles Davis – trumpet
Walter Fuller – composing
Dizzy Gillespie – composing
Doug Hawkins – engineering
Jimmy Heath – tenor saxophone
Percy Heath – double bass
Del James – composing

J.J. Johnson – composing, trombone
Hank Jones – piano
Sam Jones – bass
Lee Konitz – alto saxophone
Alfred Lion – producing
Al McKibbon – bass
Gerry Mulligan – baritone saxophone
Oscar Pettiford – bass
Max Roach – drums
Pete Rugolo – producing
Gunther Schuller – French horn
Horace Silver – piano
Rudy Van Gelder – engineering

Charting and reviews

Reviews

Charting history

References

External links

1996 compilation albums
Albums produced by Pete Rugolo
Miles Davis compilation albums
Blue Note Records compilation albums
Albums recorded at CBS 30th Street Studio
Albums produced by Alfred Lion